Railway Station, Semnan ( – Īstgāh Taḥqīqāt) is a village in Howmeh Rural District, in the Central District of Semnan County, Semnan Province, Iran. At the 2006 census, its population was 24, in 6 families.

References 

Populated places in Semnan County